Mina SayWhat Llona is an American radio and TV personality. Currently on air on Philadelphia's urban radio station WUSL - Power 99. Mina grew up in Union City and Jersey City, New Jersey. She started her radio career at the age of 18 while living in New York and attending Syracuse University. She graduated cum laude from Syracuse University with a dual major in television, radio, and film from the S.I. Newhouse School of Public Communication and Political Science. She also minored in the Music business. Mina worked for Sirius XM Radio for four years before to working at Power 99. She is also the voice of the weather for 103.5 The Beat in Miami. She is an ambassador for the Philadelphia 76ers' community outreach program, "Sixer's Strong,"  and works with the 76ers' Latino youth basketball league, "La Liga Del Barrio,"  which is open for boys and girls ages 6 to 17 and consists of 28 teams.

Radio career

Mina SayWhat has many career highlights. Some memorable conversations would include her talk with Nas where he opens up for the first time about why he chose to put his ex-wife, Kelis, wedding dress on his album cover "Life is Good". Lupe Fiasco created an uproar after his talk with Mina when he criticized President Obama's war ethics. On April 7, 2013, Ace Hood opened up about his family and revealed that he decided to go a different musical route with his album "Trials and Tribulations". ASAP Rocky announced his "Long Live ASAP" album release in detail with Mina SayWhat. Meek Mill also created some headlines when he addressed Kendrick Lamar's diss with Mina. After Kendrick Lamar's verse on Big Sean's Control was released, the whole hip-hop community was up in arms about Kendrick calling everyone out and saying he's the king. Meek Mill exclusively responded to these claims by telling Mina, "He can run the backpack, Imma run these streets." While promoting his "Seen It All" album, Young Jeezy discussed assumptions that his album cover pays homage to the "Illuminati" and also detailed why he rapped about his labels', Def Jam, lack of support on his song "Me Ok".

College Radio

Mina received a full academic scholarship to attend Syracuse University. She started as a Political Science major and picked up a communications major in the first semester after becoming involved with the college radio station WJPZ-FM Z89.1. Her experience at the station made her decide she wanted to pursue a career in radio. Mina decided to dual major in Television,radio, and film at the very respected S. I. Newhouse School of Public Communications and also had a MusicbBusiness minor in the College Of Visual& Performing Arts, both at Syracuse University. She eventually became the station's vice president of programming, overseeing a staff of 150 people.

In addition to that, she interned at two radio stations. One as the on-air/promotion intern at WWHT Hot 107.9 Syracuse, and one as the programming intern at WQHT Hot 97 New York.

SIRIUS XM

Upon graduating from Syracuse University at the age of 22, Mina was hired by the programming department at Sirius Satellite Radio. Three months after being hired, Sirius Satellite Radio merged with XM Satellite Radio to create Sirius XM Radio. After the merger, Mina SayWhat surfaced on-air on the hip hop/r&b channel The Heat (Sirius XM). She created, produced, and hosted The Warm Up, a new music show on The Heat, and hosted the channel's weekend countdown. While on her show, Mina conducted R&B artist Elle Varner’s first radio interview and broke records, such as Miguel's "Adorn," which eventually reached No. 1, and won a Grammy Award.

After the merger on the radio programming side, Mina was promoted. She programmed the channel Sirius XM Love and the holiday channel "'Sirius XM Holly"'. Mina aided in the programming of the '80s on 8 on Sirius XM and worked with all 4 original MTV VJ’s Mark Goodman, Martha Quinn, Nina Blackwood, and Alan Hunter (VJ).  She was also the Music Director and Social Media Manager for The Heat. She returned to host MinasHouse on The Heat in 2018 which airs Monday through Friday from 6 pm to midnight.

Power 99 Philly 

Mina currently broadcasts on the legendary urban radio station WUSL in Philadelphia. She was recruited to join their morning show as an on-air host and oversee the digital and social media efforts for the urban Clear Channel Communications radio stations in Philly.  Beginning there at the age of 25, Mina is the youngest female radio personality to ever host morning drive in Philly.  Since joining mornings, the show's ratings have reached #1. She also founded an all-girls dance team, the Power Squad, which she currently leads, and Mina also hosts a new artist showcase called “Next On Deck.”

TV

Mina has been featured on Fox News Channel in Philly and was also featured on NBC News.

Accolades

 Cover Of Syracuse Magazine
 John Bayliss Radio Scholar
 Philadelphia 76ers Ambassador

References

American radio DJs
American women radio presenters
Spanish radio presenters
Spanish women radio presenters
Living people
Syracuse University alumni
Year of birth missing (living people)